The Church of Saint Romanus the Martyr is a Roman Catholic titular church in Rome, Italy, in the Pietralata quarter.

Storia 
Built in 2004, the church is the seat of the parish of the same name, which was established in 1973 and entrusted to the Roman clergy. Until 2004, the parish was housed in some premises near Cave di Pietralata street.

It is dedicated to Saint Romanus the Martyr, celebrated on August 9.

The parish was established on February 6, 1973, by Cardinal Vicar Ugo Poletti's decree, "Neminem fugit". The parish territory was drawn from the nearby Sant'Atanasio parish.

Cardinal Priest 
Since February 14, 2015, it has served as the titular church for the Ethiopian Cardinal Berhaneyesus Demerew Souraphiel.

Notes

References 
 
  LIPA, Fra le strade e i palazzi. La nuova evangelizzazione a Roma, nell'esperienza della parrocchia di S. Romano.

External links 

 Saint Romanus the Martyr at the Diocese of Rome website 
  

Romanus the Martyr
21st-century Roman Catholic church buildings in Italy
Rome Q. XXI Pietralata